Ismail El Shafei and Brian Fairlie were the defending champions but only Fairlie competed that year with Russell Simpson.

Fairlie and Simpson lost in the first round to Mark Edmondson and John Marks.

John Newcombe and Tony Roche won in the final 6–7, 6–3, 6–1 against Ross Case and Geoff Masters.

Seeds

  Syd Ball /  Kim Warwick (first round)
  Ross Case /  Geoff Masters (final)
  Jürgen Fassbender /  Karl Meiler (semifinals)
  Bob Carmichael /  Ken Rosewall (first round)

Draw

External links
1977 Custom Credit Australian Indoor Championships Doubles Draw

Doubles